James Milton McGlothlin (October 6, 1943 – December 23, 1975), nicknamed "Red", was an American Major League Baseball pitcher. Born in Los Angeles, he graduated from Reseda High School in 1961 and was signed the following year by the Los Angeles Angels. During a nine-year MLB career, he pitched for the California Angels (1965–1969), Cincinnati Reds (1970–73) and Chicago White Sox (1973).

Baseball career

California Angels
McGlothlin made his major league debut at age 21 on September 20, 1965, allowing four earned runs in five innings pitched in a 4–2 home loss against the Baltimore Orioles.

After having already started in 29 games that season, McGlothlin pitched in relief in the second games of both doubleheaders versus the Detroit Tigers on the final weekend of that season, and was the winning pitcher in the final game, which eliminated the Tigers from the American League pennant race.

The Angels had been one of five contenders in the 1967 race until a disastrous, mid-August stretch saw them lose 12 out of 15 games and drop from 1 games behind to 8 lengths out of the league lead. McGlothlin's record suffered with his team's, as he dropped 31 of 49 decisions and posted above-3.00 earned run averages. On November 25, 1969, he was included in one of the off-season's high profile interleague trades when the Angels sent him and fellow pitchers Pedro Borbón and Vern Geishert to the Cincinnati Reds for hard-hitting outfielder Alex Johnson and utility infielder Chico Ruiz.

Cincinnati Reds
In his first season in the National League, McGlothlin proceeded to win a career-high 14 games for the pennant-winning 1970 "Big Red Machine", leading the staff with three shutouts and finishing third on the Reds in innings pitched (210). In , he lowered his earned run average from 3.59 to 3.22 and remained on the team's top ten players in wins above replacement, but he dropped 12 of 20 decisions as Cincinnati won 23 fewer games than in 1970 and fell back in the standings. In strike-shortened , McGlothlin's final full season with the Reds, he started 21 regular-season games and posted a winning record (9–8) for a pennant-winning club. But his effectiveness diminished: his ERA rose to 3.91 and, for the first time as an MLB starting pitcher, he allowed more hits (165) than innings pitched (145).

He was the Reds' starting pitcher in one game each in both the 1970 and 1972 World Series. In Game 2 of the 1970 World Series, he did not earn a decision after working 4 innings against the Baltimore Orioles; the Reds dropped that game, 6–5, en route to a five-game Series loss. In Game 5 of the 1972 classic, he allowed four earned runs in three full innings against the Oakland Athletics and Catfish Hunter. The Reds would win the game in the ninth, 5-4. McGlothlin received a no decision.

Late career
McGlothlin was traded back to the American League, to the Chicago White Sox, on August 29, 1973. He last pitched for the White Sox at age 29 on September 28, 1973. His final game was the only game he started in a Chicago uniform, and he absorbed a 4–1 defeat at the hands of the Oakland Athletics. The White Sox released McGlothlin in March 1974, ending his baseball career.

In 256 regular-season games pitched, including 201 starts, McGlothlin compiled a 67–77 won–lost mark, with 36 complete games, 11 shutouts, and a 3.61 earned run average. In 1,300 career innings pitched, he permitted 1,247 hits and 418 bases on balls, striking out 709. He earned three career saves. In the postseason, he went unscored upon in one inning pitched during the 1972 National League Championship Series (his only LCS appearance), and in his two World Series starts, he allowed eight hits, four bases on balls, and eight earned runs in 8 innings pitched without earning a decision.

Illness and death
Less than a year after leaving the game, McGlothlin became gravely ill. Although an initial diagnosis of late-stage stomach cancer was incorrect, he proved to have an untreatable form of leukemia; he died at age 32 on December 23, 1975, at his home in Union, Kentucky, near Cincinnati. He was survived by his wife and three children.

References

External links

Retrosheet
Society for American Baseball Research, McGlothlin biography by Charles  Faber

1943 births
1975 deaths
American League All-Stars
Baseball players from Los Angeles
California Angels players
Cincinnati Reds players
Chicago White Sox players
Deaths from cancer in Kentucky
Deaths from leukemia
Hawaii Islanders players
Industriales de Valencia players
Major League Baseball pitchers
Nashville Vols players
Quad Cities Angels players
Seattle Angels players